WXHQ-LP (105.9 FM, "Radio Newport") is a non-commercial radio station licensed to the community of Newport, Rhode Island. The station serves Newport and the greater Providence, Rhode Island, area.  The station is owned and operated by the Newport Music Arts Association, a non-profit organization.  It airs a Jazz/Freeform format that, according to the station's website, includes "jazz, blues, r&b, bossa nova, Afro-Cuban, lounge, soul, funk, reggae, ska, electronic, downtempo, acid-jazz, surf, world, country, folk, and even occasionally some rock". The music played is almost exclusively instrumental and the station has a policy against playing songs featuring English language vocals.

The station has been assigned the WXHQ-LP call letters by the Federal Communications Commission since May 31, 2001. This is the first FCC-licensed low-power FM station in the state of Rhode Island. WXHQ-LP is also the first public radio station licensed to Newport.

Community involvement
The WXHQ-LP studios are located on in a small office on Marlborough Street. The station's transmitter is located atop the Hotel Viking on Bellvue Avenue in downtown Newport. This transmitter site includes a rooftop container garden used to promote sustainable agriculture and green living by collecting rainwater and growing food.

Other community involvement activities of WXHQ-LP include providing music programming for the annual Newport Island Moving Co. dance festival, broadcasting the Newport Jazz Festival, and serving as a contributing sponsor each year for the Newport International Film Festival.

FCC actions
On October 29, 2007, the FCC issued a $250 Notice of Apparent Liability for Forfeiture for WXHQ-LP to licensee Newport Music Arts Association. The fine was levied because the station failed to file a timely license renewal application and did not provide an explanation for the late filing. The standard fine of $3,000 was reduced because the licensee did file a renewal application before the actual expiration of the broadcast license.

References

External links
WXHQ-LP studio building @ BostonRadio.org
WXHQ-LP tower and antenna @ NECRAT
 

XHQ
WXHQ
Freeform radio stations
XHQ-LP
Newport County, Rhode Island
Radio stations established in 2001